Top Country Albums is a chart that ranks the top-performing country music albums in the United States, published by Billboard.  In 1995, seven different albums topped the chart, based on electronic point of sale data provided by SoundScan Inc.

In the issue of Billboard dated January 7, Garth Brooks was at number one with the compilation album The Hits, its second week in the top spot.  The album held the peak position for the first 14 weeks of 1995 and returned to number one for a single week later in the year; its 16 weeks atop the chart took Brooks's total number of weeks in the top spot to 113 in less than five years.  The singer returned to number one in December with his next album Fresh Horses, which held the top spot for the final four weeks of the year; he was the only artist to achieve more than one chart-topper during 1995.  The Hits was replaced at number one by the eponymous album by John Michael Montgomery, which entered the chart at number one in the issue of Billboard dated April 15 and spent 13 consecutive weeks in the top spot.  It was Montgomery's second consecutive chart-topper, but would prove to be his last album to reach number one.

In July, Shania Twain gained her first number one with The Woman in Me; the album spent 11 weeks in the top spot in 1995 but would return to number one for a further 18 weeks the following year, making it the longest-running number one country album to date by a female artist.  The album launched the Canadian singer to stardom in both the country and pop markets, and helped to make her one of the most globally successful recording artists of the 1990s.  While Garth Brooks's The Hits was the only one of 1995's Top Country Albums number ones to also top the all-genre Billboard 200 chart, every other country chart-topper reached the top five of that listing.  In the mid-1990s, sales of country albums reached unprecedented levels, with Brooks and Twain in particular experiencing levels of mainstream popularity and success unheard of for a country artist; both The Hits and The Woman in Me would go on to be certified at least ten times platinum by the Recording Industry Association of America.

Chart history

References

1995
1995 record charts